The Korea Scout Association is the national Scouting association of South Korea.

Scouting was founded in Korea in 1922 while under Japanese rule, and sent representatives to the first Far East Scouting competition in Beijing in 1924.  However, it was banned by the occupation authorities from 1937 until August 15, 1945.  It existed in all areas of the Korean peninsula prior to the Korean War in 1950.  World Organization of the Scout Movement recognition came in 1953. The total membership in 2011 was 201,455 registered Scouts.

Dr. Kim Yong-woo, the first Tiger Scout and former Minister of National Defense was awarded the Bronze Wolf Award, the only distinction of the World Organization of the Scout Movement, awarded by the World Scout Committee for exceptional services to world Scouting, in 1975.

History

Scouting during Japanese rule 
Japanese military authorities did not consistently encourage the Scouting movement in occupied territories. Where local conditions were favorable, authorities would permit local Scouting or introduce Japanese-style Scouting, or Shōnendan, and sometimes even made this compulsory. On the other hand, where conditions were not favorable, and anti-Japanese sentiments were likely to be nurtured through Scouting, the authorities would prohibit it entirely. Scouting in Korea was prohibited by the Japanese occupation authorities from 1937 to 1945.

Program and ideals

The Tiger Scout is the highest rank and award the Scout and the Venture Scout may achieve.

An active Air Scout program is also popular.

Officially the round-shaped outer petals of the new purple fleur-de-lis are based on the taeguk, symbolizing hope of reunification of the Korean peninsula. A tiger head, symbolizing bravery, is also featured.

Councils
The KSA operates and maintains 21 councils, 18 geographical, 3 religious, and a National Council for top-level staff and employees.

World and regional events hosted
 17th World Scout Jamboree, 1991
 17th Asia Pacific Jamboree, 1996
 Asia Pacific Regional Youth Forum, 1996
 21st Asia-Pacific/10th Korea National Jamboree, 2000
 Asia-Pacific Workshop on Youth Programme, 2000
 International Patrol Jamboree, 2002
 Asia Pacific Regional Workshop on PR, ICT and Marketing, 2003
 25th World Scout Jamboree, Saemangeum, 2023

Scouting in North Korea

North Korea shared a common Scout history with South Korea until 1950, but at present is one of only four of the world's independent countries that do not have Scouting. North Korea instead created the Young Pioneer Corps under the Korean Children's Union.

See also
Girl Scouts Korea
World Buddhist Scout Brotherhood
Simon Hang-Bock Rhee
Kim Eun Gui

References

Scouting in South Korea
World Organization of the Scout Movement member organizations
Youth organizations established in 1922
1922 establishments in Korea